Greene County is a county located in the U.S. state of Iowa. As of the 2020 census, the population was 8,771. The county seat is Jefferson. The county is named in honor of General Nathanael Greene.

History
Greene County was formed on January 15, 1851, and from 1854, self-governed.  It was named after General Nathanael Greene, a hero in the Revolutionary War.  The first settler was Truman Davis. He settled on the Raccoon River. 
The first courthouse was built in 1856 from wood.  Previously court was held in a log cabin southeast of Jefferson.  The second courthouse, of red brick, was built in 1870.  The present Greene County Courthouse used today was built in 1917.

Geography

Major highways
 U.S. Highway 30
 Iowa Highway 4
 Iowa Highway 25
 Iowa Highway 144

Adjacent counties
Calhoun County  (northwest)
Webster County  (northeast)
Boone County  (east)
Dallas County  (southeast)
Guthrie County  (south)
Carroll County  (west)

Demographics

2020 census
There were 4,309 housing units, of which 3,802 were occupied.

2010 census
There were 4,546 housing units, of which 3,996 were occupied.

2000 census

As of the census of 2000, there were 10,366 people, 4,205 households, and 2,859 families residing in the county.  The population density was 18 people per square mile (7/km2).  There were 4,623 housing units at an average density of 8 per square mile (3/km2).  The racial makeup of the county was 98.16% White, 0.14% Black or African American, 0.15% Native American, 0.24% Asian, 0.01% Pacific Islander, 0.67% from other races, and 0.63% from two or more races.  1.66% of the population were Hispanic or Latino of any race.

There were 4,205 households, out of which 30.70% had children under the age of 18 living with them, 57.30% were married couples living together, 7.20% had a female householder with no husband present, and 32.00% were non-families. 29.10% of all households were made up of individuals, and 16.60% had someone living alone who was 65 years of age or older.  The average household size was 2.41 and the average family size was 2.97.

In the county, the population was spread out, with 25.60% under the age of 18, 6.10% from 18 to 24, 24.30% from 25 to 44, 22.40% from 45 to 64, and 21.60% who were 65 years of age or older.  The median age was 41 years. For every 100 females there were 95.50 males.  For every 100 females age 18 and over, there were 89.20 males.

The median income for a household in the county was $33,883, and the median income for a family was $41,230. Males had a median income of $29,076 versus $21,657 for females. The per capita income for the county was $16,866.  About 4.80% of families and 8.10% of the population were below the poverty line, including 8.90% of those under age 18 and 7.80% of those age 65 or over.

Cities and towns

Churdan
Dana
Grand Junction
Jefferson
Paton
Ralston
Rippey
Scranton

Unincorporated community
Cooper

Townships

Bristol
Cedar
Dawson
Franklin
Grant
Greenbrier
Hardin 
Highland
Jackson
Jefferson
Junction
Kendrick
Paton
Scranton
Washington
Willow

Population ranking
The population ranking of the following table is based on the 2020 census of Greene County.

† county seat

Notable people
 George Horace Gallup (1901–1984), former resident, American statistician, invented the Gallup poll, a successful statistical method of survey sampling for measuring public opinion.
 Loren Shriver (b. 1944), former resident, American astronaut, retired United States Air Force colonel.
 Warren Allen Smith (1921–2017), former resident, American homosexual activist, writer and humanist.
 Doreen Wilber (1930–2008), former resident, American archer, Olympic gold medalist.

Politics

See also

National Register of Historic Places listings in Greene County, Iowa
 Raccoon River Valley Trail

References

External links

County website 

 
1851 establishments in Iowa
Populated places established in 1851